The UK Rock & Metal Albums Chart is a record chart which ranks the best-selling rock and heavy metal albums in the United Kingdom. Compiled and published by the Official Charts Company, the data is based on each album's weekly physical sales and digital downloads.

Chart history

See also
List of UK Rock & Metal Singles Chart number ones of 2020

References

External links
Official UK Rock & Metal Albums Chart Top 40 at the Official Charts Company
The Official UK Top 40 Rock Albums at BBC Radio 1

2020 in British music
United Kingdom Rock and Metal Albums
2020